Vuk Ćosić (born 31 July 1966) is a Slovenian contemporary artist associated with the net.art movement.

Active in politics, literature and art, Ćosić has exhibited, published, and been active since 1994. He is well known for his challenging, ground-breaking work as a pioneer in the field of net.art. His constantly evolving oeuvre is characterized by an interesting mix of philosophical, political, and conceptual network-related issues on the one hand, and an innovative feeling for contemporary urban and underground aesthetics on the other.

One of the pioneers of net.art, Ćosić became deeply interested in ASCII code during a long period of research (1996–2001) on low-tech aesthetics, the economy, ecology and archaeology of the media, on the intersections between text and computer code, on the use of spaces in information, its fluid nature and infinite convertibility. Out of this came History of Art for the Blind, ASCII Unreal (an art game), ASCII Camera, ASCII Architecture, Deep ASCII and ASCII History of Moving Images, a history of the cinema converted into text format.  He is a co-founder of Nettime, Syndicate, 7-11, and Ljubljana Digital Media Lab. The most notable venues, among many others, include Videotage, Hong Kong; Media Artlab, Tel Aviv; Venice Biennial; MIT Medialab; Walker Center, Minneapolis; Postmasters, NYC; Kunsthalle, Vienna; LAMoCA, Los Angeles; ICA, London and Beaubourg, Paris.

Art

Ćosić uses ASCII characters (American Standard Code for Information Interchange) to form images or videos. He created his own software to convert the pixels from still and moving images into ASCII, and he has also experimented with audio and camera movement being transcribed through ASCII. Short sentences or paragraphs relevant to his work are often briefly summarized through few fragments of text in ASCII form.

Ćosić has put together a retrospective of some of his net.art, including various images from History of Art For Airports. Ćosić borrowed both iconic and lesser known images, reducing them to resemble the kind of pictograms found on lavatory doors. The sources of many of the images are instantly recognizable, such as Cézanne's Card Players and Warhol's Campbell's Soup. 

Some of his more notable works were made from scenes from classic films including ASCII History of Moving Images in 1999, portraying a scene from Alfred Hitchcock's film Psycho. Another depicting a scene from the pornographic movie Deep Throat, remade as Deep ASCII. Ćosić had made a series of short animated sequences form various films and TV series going from Star Trek to King Kong, while in addition, constructing photographs of classical art such as Venus, Lascaux, and more. The major focus into classical mediums indicates Ćosić's possible interest in the historical aspects of art.

The show also includes a new work, File Extinguisher, which Ćosić describes as "a project that fixes the web by providing the surfer with a totally free file deleting service. All you need to do is upload your file and we'll delete it for you, completely."

The ASCII History of Art for the Blind is a webpage that describes selected images verbally by reading each of the ASCII characters that make up the image through an automatic recordings.

War is a collection of files stored with images taken in front of a TV screen in 1999, recording the events that took place during the NATO bombing of Yugoslavia.

Personal exhibitions and projects

1991
Basta, Dubrovnik (with Krpan, Martek, Opalić, Talent, Tolj), Dubrovnik

1992
Ljubljana, Flat Jurij Krpan
Trieste, Galeria Juliet
Total Egal, St. Lambrecht (with Antun Maračič & Nenad Dančuo)

1994
Hollywood, Ljubljana, Ljubljana Castle

1995
Le Coco Fruitwear (Urbanaria - Part Two, with Matej Andraž Vogrinčič), Ljubljana, Prešernov trg > (Trabakula), Rijeka, Dubrovnik, Split > London, ICA > (Biennale dei Giovani Artisti dell'Europa e del Mediterraneo), Torino

1996
Velodrome Online (with Luka Frelih & Strip Core, The Drug of the Natyon), Copenhagen, Electronic Cafe International

1997
Raziskovalni Inštitut za Geo-umetniško statistiko Republike Slovenije: Public presentation of the mobile etalon of the Slovene Mediterranean metre (with Alenka Pirman & Irena Wölle), Piran, Tartinijev trg > Biennale dei Giovani Artisti dell'Europa e del Mediterraneo, Torino
A Day in the Life of a Net.artist (Media in Media), Ljubljana, Mestna galerija

1998
History of Art for the Airports, Tank, No. 1, London
Lascaux, venus, st. sebastien,  pieta,  Cézanne,  duchamp,  malevich,  warhol, lumiere bros, star trek, king kong, haiku, jodi, bunting, shoulgin

1998
ASCII History of Moving Art, Ćosić's work presents seven short clips from well-known sources that recall points when film, television, and video were finding their voices as the new media of their day

2010
As part of the 2010 celebrations in Ljubljana for having been nominated by UNESCO as the tenth World Book Capital, Ćosić held a book burning exhibit and lecture at the Trubar Literature House in homage to the anti-protestant book burning in the same city, in 1598 (where books by the protestant reformer Primož Trubar, after whom the venue is named, were presumably burned). The exhibit also alluded to the book burning event by Hebrew and Yiddish writer Ka-Tzetnik, who in 1993 stole a rare copy of his prewar book of poetry from the National Library of Israel, purportedly burnt it, and sent the remains back to the library with instructions to burn them, like all that was dear to him had burned in the Auschwitz crematoria.

Videography

DEEP ASCII
TTYvideo software, java, VHS, Vuk Ćosić, Amsterdam-Ljubljana 1998, 55'
Script & Dir Vuk Ćosić
Programming Luka Frelih
C'Mon Babe Light My Fire 03.15
Purple Haze 02.46
California Dreamin 02.50
Venus 03.16
My Generation 03.08
Should I Stay or Should I Go 03.50

video de musica

ASciikk
TTYvideo software, java, VHS, Vuk Ćosić, Amsterdam-Ljubljana 1998, 55'
Script & Dir Vuk Ćosić
Programming Luka Frelih
6 video clips by the Russian cyberpunk artist Alexei Shoulgin in the moving ASCII, published at a web site as well as on a VinylVideoTM record.

Ćosić's Net.Art
 File Extinguisher
 War
 ASCII Camera
 This is unreal
 ascii history of art for the blind
 ascii history of moving images
  history of art for airports
 net.art per se

References

  New Media Art· Mark Tribe and Reena Jana.
 "Vuk Ćosić." Artforum International 40.7 (Mar. 2002): 40. Academic Search Premier. EBSCO. [Library name], [City], [State abbreviation]. 29 Apr. 2008 <>.
 Vuk COSIC. http://www.videodokument.org/cosic/cosic.htm; accessdate=2008-05-05. author= Barbara

External links
  History of art for airports
 Official website

Sources

Araújo, Sandra. (2010). Deconstructing Vuk Ćosić: Data as Language. Art & Education. 

Rinehard, Richard. (2011). "Vuk Ćosić: ASCII History of Moving Images" University of California, Berkeley Art Museum & Pacific Film Archive. 

1966 births
Net.artists
Slovenian contemporary artists
Artists from Belgrade
Artists from Ljubljana
Living people
Slovenian people of Serbian descent